Alexei Pavlovich Tezikov (June 22, 1978 – July 16, 2020) was a Russian professional ice hockey defenceman who played in the National Hockey League with the Washington Capitals and Vancouver Canucks.

Originally drafted by the Buffalo Sabres in the 1996 NHL Entry Draft, Tezikov was dealt at the trade deadline of the 1998–99 NHL season to the Washington Capitals in exchange for Joé Juneau.  He spent a few years in the minors before being traded to the Mighty Ducks of Anaheim, and then was claimed on waivers by the Vancouver Canucks.

Tezikov left North America following the 2001–02 season, returning to his native Russia to play in the Russian Superleague and Kontinental Hockey League over the next 11 years.

Tezikov died on July 16, 2020, at the age of 42, after suffering a heart attack.

Career statistics

Regular season and playoffs

International

Awards and honors

References

External links

1978 births
2020 deaths
Amur Khabarovsk players
Buffalo Sabres draft picks
Cincinnati Cyclones (IHL) players
Cincinnati Mighty Ducks players
Place of death missing
HC Donbass players
HC Lada Togliatti players
HC Neftekhimik Nizhnekamsk players
Severstal Cherepovets players
HC Sibir Novosibirsk players
Manitoba Moose players
Moncton Wildcats players
Sportspeople from Tolyatti
Portland Pirates players
Rochester Americans players
Russian ice hockey defencemen
Sokil Kyiv players
Torpedo Nizhny Novgorod players
Vancouver Canucks players
Washington Capitals players